Minuscule 114 (in the Gregory-Aland numbering), ε 1018 (Soden), is a Greek minuscule manuscript of the New Testament, on parchment leaves. Palaeographically it has been assigned to the 11th century. It has marginalia.

Description 

The codex contains the text of the four Gospels on 280 parchment leaves (size ). It has some lacunae in Matthew 17:4-18; 26:59-73, Matthew 28:19-Mark 1:12 added by a later hand.
The headpieces are decorated with gold and silver. It has itacistic errors.

The text is written in one column per page, in 20 lines per page. It is written by very elegant hand, with more recent marginal notes. There is also a division according to the Ammonian Sections, but there is no references to the Eusebian Canons.

The Menologion was added in the 13th century. It has itacistic errors.

Text 

Hermann von Soden classified it to the textual family Π. Kurt Aland the Greek text of the codex did not place in any Category.
According to the Claremont Profile Method it represents textual family Πa in Luke 1, Luke 10, and Luke 20.

History 

In 1617 it belonged to Nicolaus Faber, Dominican. It was examined by Griesbach, Bloomfield. The text of the codex was published in 1837 (London) by Taylor. C. R. Gregory saw it in 1883. The manuscript was rebound in 1967.

It is currently housed at the British Library (Harley MS 5540).

See also 
 List of New Testament minuscules
 Biblical manuscript
 Textual criticism

References

Further reading

External links 
 Codex Harleianus 5540 at the Britisch Library

Greek New Testament minuscules
11th-century biblical manuscripts
Harleian Collection